Plymouth County is a county in the U.S. state of Massachusetts, south of Boston. As of the 2020 census, the population was 530,819.  Its county seats are Plymouth and Brockton. In 1685, the county was created by the Plymouth General Court, the legislature of Plymouth Colony, predating its annexation by the Massachusetts Bay Colony.

Plymouth County is part of the 
Boston–Cambridge–Newton, MA–NH Metropolitan Statistical Area.

Geography
It is the third-largest county in Massachusetts by total area.

Adjacent counties
The towns of Hingham and Hull in Plymouth County extend north of Norfolk County and face onto Massachusetts Bay, sharing a northern water boundary with Suffolk County.
Norfolk County (north)
Barnstable County (southeast)
Bristol County (west)

National protected area
 Boston Harbor Islands National Recreation Area (part)
 Massasoit National Wildlife Refuge

Major highways

Demographics

2000 census
At the 2000 census there were 472,972 people, 168,361 households, and 122,398 families in the county. The racial makeup of the county was 88.70% White, 4.56% Black or African American, 0.21% Native American, 0.92% Asian, 0.02% Pacific Islander, 3.06% from other races, and 2.52% from two or more races.  2.44%. were Hispanic or Latino of any race. 28.0% were of Irish, 12.8% Italian, 10.6% English and 5.1% American ancestry, 90.1% spoke English, 2.5% Spanish, 2.3% Portuguese, 1.5% French Creole and 1.0% French as their first language.

Of the 168,361 households 36.30% had children under the age of 18 living with them, 57.00% were married couples living together, 11.90% had a female householder with no husband present, and 27.30% were non-families. 22.20% of households were one person and 9.00% were one person aged 65 or older.  The average household size was 2.74 and the average family size was 3.23.

The age distribution was 26.80% under the age of 18, 7.20% from 18 to 24, 30.40% from 25 to 44, 23.90% from 45 to 64, and 11.80% 65 or older.  The median age was 37 years. For every 100 females, there were 95.00 males.  For every 100 females age 18 and over, there were 91.30 males.

The median household income was $55,615 and the median family income was $65,554 (these figures had risen to $70,335 and $82,560 respectively as of a 2007 estimate). Males had a median income of $45,535 versus $31,389 for females. The per capita income for the county was $24,789.  About 4.90% of families and 6.60% of the population were below the poverty line, including 8.30% of those under age 18 and 7.90% of those age 65 or over.

The leading ancestry group in Plymouth County is Irish, with 31%. Plymouth County, along with Norfolk County, Massachusetts, claims the highest percentage of people with Irish ancestry in the United States.

2010 census
At the 2010 census, there were 494,919 people, 181,126 households, and 127,925 families in the county. The racial makeup of the county was 85.5% white, 7.2% black or African American, 1.2% Asian, 0.2% American Indian, 3.2% from other races, and 2.6% from two or more races. Those of Hispanic or Latino origin made up 3.2% of the population. In terms of ancestry, 33.7% were Irish, 15.8% were Italian, 15.3% were English, 7.3% were German, and 3.7% were American.

Of the 181,126 households, 35.1% had children under the age of 18 living with them, 53.6% were married couples living together, 12.6% had a female householder with no husband present, 29.4% were non-families, and 23.8% of households were made up of individuals. The average household size was 2.67 and the average family size was 3.18. The median age was 41.1 years.

The median household income was $73,131 and the median family income was $86,251. Males had a median income of $60,303 versus $43,837 for females. The per capita income for the county was $33,333. About 5.0% of families and 7.0% of the population were below the poverty line, including 8.3% of those under age 18 and 7.0% of those age 65 or over.

Demographic breakdown by town

Income

The ranking of unincorporated communities that are included on the list are reflective if the census designated locations and villages were included as cities or towns. Data is from the 2007–2011 American Community Survey 5-Year Estimates.

Government and politics

Elected Officials
Plymouth County is governed by three County Commissioners:

Chairman Jared L. Valanzola (R-Rockland) 
, Commissioner Sandra M. Wright (R-Bridgewater),
and Commissioner Gregory M. Hanley (D-Plymouth)

Other county elected officials include Sheriff Joseph D. McDonald, jr. (R-Kingston), District Attorney Timothy Cruz (R-Marshfield), Treasurer Thomas J. O'Brien (D-Plymouth), Register of Deeds John R. Buckley, jr. (D-Brockton), Register of Probate Matthew McDonough (D-Marshfield), and Clerk of Courts Robert Creedon (D-Brockton)

Presidential Election Results

From the late 19th to the mid 20th centuries, Plymouth County was a Republican Party stronghold in presidential elections. From 1876 to 1988, only three Democrats carried the county: Lyndon Johnson, Hubert Humphrey, and Jimmy Carter. Since 1992, however, it has become solidly Democratic, though less so relative to other counties in the state. In 2012, Mitt Romney lost the county by 4.2 points, the closest a Republican has come to winning a county in Massachusetts since 1988. However, it has become more Democratic afterwards, and in 2020, Joe Biden carried the county by 17 points, the largest margin of victory for a Democrat since 1996.

County seal
The seal was adopted by the Plymouth County Commissioners on March 31, 1931, under the authority of the General Laws, Chapter 34, Section 14, and was designed by Frederic T. Bailey of North Scituate who was, at that time and for many years, Chairman of the county commissioners.

Media
For television, the city is served by the Boston and Providence media markets; no television stations are located within the county.

Radio stations located in Plymouth County include:

The first radio broadcast in history was made in 1906, from the Brant Rock neighborhood in the town of Marshfield.

The Brockton Enterprise is the only daily newspaper published in the county, although the Quincy Patriot Ledger has extensive coverage of the South Shore of Massachusetts generally and Plymouth County in particular.

There are numerous weekly newspapers published in the county, including:
 Abington Mariner  – Abington
 Duxbury Clipper  – Duxbury
 The Hingham Journal  – Hingham
 Marshfield Mariner -  – Marshfield
 Old Colony Memorial  – Plymouth
Plympton-Halifax Express – Plympton and Halifax
 Rockland Standard – Rockland
 Scituate Mariner  – Scituate
 The Sentinel – Marion and Rochester

Many were operated by the Memorial Press Group, based in Plymouth, until the chain was sold to GateHouse Media in 2006.  The flagship of the group was the Old Colony Memorial, the oldest continually published weekly newspaper in New England, first published in 1822.

Communities

Cities
Bridgewater
Brockton (traditional county seat)

Towns

Abington
Carver
Duxbury
East Bridgewater
Halifax
Hanover
Hanson
Hingham
Hull
Kingston
Lakeville
Marion
Marshfield
Mattapoisett
Middleborough
Norwell
Pembroke
Plymouth (traditional county seat)
Plympton
Rochester
Rockland
Scituate
Wareham
West Bridgewater
Whitman

Census-designated places

Bridgewater
Cedar Crest
Duxbury
Green Harbor
Hanson
Hingham
Kingston
Marion Center
Marshfield
Marshfield Hills
Mattapoisett Center
Middleborough Center
North Lakeville
North Pembroke
North Plymouth
North Scituate
Ocean Bluff-Brant Rock
Onset
The Pinehills
Plymouth ("Plymouth Center")
Scituate
South Duxbury
Wareham Center
West Wareham
Weweantic
White Island Shores

Other villages

Bryantville
Cedarville
Chiltonville
Ellisville
Elmwood
Greenbush
Manomet
Micajah Heights
Monponsett
North Middleborough
North Rochester
Plymouth Beach
Priscilla Beach
Saquish
South Carver
South Middleborough
South Plymouth
South Pond
Vallerville
Wellingsley
West Plymouth
West Wind Shores
White Horse Beach

See also

 List of Massachusetts locations by per capita income
 Registry of Deeds (Massachusetts)
 National Register of Historic Places listings in Plymouth County, Massachusetts

Footnotes

Further reading
 Dean Dudley, Historical Sketches of Towns in Plymouth and Barnstable Counties, Massachusetts. Boston: D. Dudley and Co., 1873.
 D. Hamilton Hurd, History of Plymouth County, Massachusetts: With Biographical Sketches of Many of its Pioneers and Prominent Men. In Two Volumes. Philadelphia: J.W. Lewis and Co., 1884. Volume 1 | Volume 2
 Biographical Review Volume 18, Containing Life Sketches of Leading Citizens of Plymouth County, Massachusetts. Boston: Biographical Review Publishing Company, 1897.

External links

 
 Plymouth County Commissioners
 Map of cities and towns of Massachusetts 
 Plymouth Registry of Deeds
 Brockton Registry of Deeds Satellite Office
 Plymouth County Retirement Association
 Plymouth County Retirement Association
 Plymouth County Sheriff's Office
 Wall & Gray. 1871 Atlas of Massachusetts. Map of Massachusetts. USA. New England.
 Counties – Berkshire, Franklin, Hampshire and Hampden, Worcester, Middlesex, Essex and Norfolk, Boston – Suffolk,
 Plymouth, Bristol, Barnstable, Dukes, and Nantucket (Cape Cod).
 Cities – Springfield, Worcester, Lowell, Lawrence, Haverhill, Newburyport, Salem, Lynn, Taunton, Fall River. New Bedford. These 1871 maps of the Counties and Cities are useful to see the roads and rail lines.
 Beers,D.G. 1872 Atlas of Essex County Map of Massachusetts Plate 5.  Click on the map for a very large image.

 
1685 establishments in Massachusetts
Counties of Plymouth Colony
Counties in Greater Boston
Massachusetts counties
Populated places established in 1685